The term international framework of sexual violence refers to the collection of international legal instruments – such as treaties, conventions, protocols, case law, declarations, resolutions and recommendations – developed in the 20th and 21st century to address the problem of sexual violence. The framework seeks to establish and recognise the right all human beings (especially but not only women) to not experience sexual violence, to prevent sexual violence from being committed wherever possible, to punish perpetrators of sexual violence, and to provide care for victims of sexual violence. The standards set by this framework are intended to be adopted and implemented by governments around the world in order to protect their citizens against sexual violence.

Even though international humanitarian law (IHL) strongly prohibits sexual violence in all armed conflicts and international human rights law (IHRL) and international customary law strongly prohibit it at all times, enforcement mechanisms are fragile or do not exist in many parts of the world. Acts of sexual violence can be charged as a crime against humanity, genocide, war crime, or grave breach of the Geneva Conventions.

Background 

Sexual violence includes, but is not limited to, rape. Although there is no agreed upon definition of sexual violence, commonly applied ones encompass any act of a sexual nature or attempt to obtain a sexual act carried out through coercion. Sexual violence also includes physical and psychological violence directed at a person's sexuality, including unwanted comments or advances, or acts of traffic such as forced prostitution or sexual slavery.

Sexual violence, in times of peace and armed conflict situations, is widespread and considered to be one of the most traumatic, pervasive, and most common violations human beings suffer. It is a serious public health and human rights problem and has profound short- and long- term impacts on physical and mental health. Though women and girls suffer disproportionately from this kind of violence, it can occur to anybody at any age. It is also an act of violence that can be perpetrated by parents, caregivers, acquaintances, and strangers, as well as intimate partners. Sexual violence is rarely a crime of passion; it is an aggressive act that frequently aims to express power and dominance over the victim.

Sexual violence remains highly stigmatized in all settings; thus, levels of disclosure of the assault vary between regions. In general, it is widely under-reported; thus, available data tend to underestimate the true scale of the problem. In addition, sexual violence is also a neglected area of research; thus, deeper understanding of the issue is needed to promote a coordinated movement against it. It is important to distinguish between domestic sexual violence and conflict-related sexual violence. Often, people who coerce their spouses into sexual acts believe their actions are legitimate because they are married. In times of conflict, sexual violence tends to be an inevitable repercussion of warfare trapped in an ongoing cycle of impunity. Rape is often used as a weapon of war, as a form of attack on the enemy, typifying the conquest and degradation of its women or men or captured fighters of any gender.

International humanitarian law 

References to sexual offences and violence provided in IHL instruments are only partially expressed in the 1949 Geneva Conventions, and even more vaguely considered in the 1977 Additional Protocols. By prohibiting sexual violence in a non-discriminatory manner, international humanitarian law ensures that women are protected through a two-tiered approach, being covered by general (equal protection as men) and specific protections. IHL mandates special protections to women, according to their additional needs in situations in which they find themselves more vulnerable, for example women who are widows, sick and wounded, migrants, internally displaced, or held in detention.

International criminal law 

 

Although evidence of sexual atrocities such as mass rapes is acknowledged in the Nuremberg War Crimes Tribunal and Tokyo Tribunal, references to sexual violence in their respective charter are absent. Nonetheless, the International Criminal Tribunal for Rwanda (ICTR), the International Criminal Tribunal for former Yugoslavia (ICTY), the hybrid Special Court for Sierra Leone and the Extraordinary Chambers in the Courts of Cambodia consider sexual violence as a public tool of war rather than a private crime. Groundbreaking case law both by the ad hoc Tribunals of ICTR and ICTY established unprecedented developments by classifying acts of rape and sexual violence as crimes of genocide and crimes against humanity.

International Committee of the Red Cross provided clarification with Aide-memoire, the prohibition of rape under the Geneva Conventions of 1949. The issued statements cover the breach of willfully causing great suffering or serious injury to body or health, not only rape but also any other attack on a woman’s dignity. The Aide-memoire covers the legal breadth of prohibitions enumerated under Article 147.

The Akayesu case goes beyond domestic law definitions of sexual violence and is the first case in which sexual violence is perceived as an integral part of genocide as defined in the 1948 Convention on the Prevention and Punishment of the Crime of Genocide. On 2 September 1998, the International Criminal Tribunal for Rwanda (ICTR) found Jean-Paul Akayesu guilty of genocide and crimes against humanity, and "sexual violence" is cited more than 100 times in the judgment. The trial chamber also held that "sexual violence was an integral part of the process of destruction, specifically targeting Tutsi women and specifically contributing to their destruction and to the destruction of the Tutsi group as a whole".

The first trial solely focused on the perpetration of systematic sexual violence (rape camps) and on crimes against humanity committed against women and girls was in the Foca case, a ruling before the International Criminal Tribunal for former Yugoslavia (ICTY). The Statute of the International Criminal Court (ICC) also explicitly incorporates rape and other forms of sexual violence in the list of war crimes and therefore recognizes sexual violence as a grave breach of international humanitarian law and of the Geneva Conventions.

Human rights law, the United Nations, and further developments

International conventions and declarations 
An extensive amount of both hard and soft law instruments set rules, standards and norms for the protection of victims of sexual offences. Among the wide range of international human rights law instruments are the following:

UN resolutions and reports 

The UN Security Council, ECOSOC and the UN Commission on Human Rights do not take into account the nature of the conflict with respect to the protection of women in war time.
List of UN Security Council Resolutions specifically address sexual violence:

 UNSC Resolution 1325 (2000)
 UNSC Resolution 1820 (2008) 
 UNSC Resolution 1888 (2009) 
 UNSC Resolution 1960 (2010) 
 UNSC Resolution 2106 (2013)
 UNSC Resolution 2242 (2015)
 UNSC Resolution 2331 (2016)
 UNSC Resolution 2467 (2019)

Reports from the Secretary-General relate to sexual violence in conflict:

 Report of the SG on the implementation of SC resolutions 1820 and 1888 (2010) 
 Report of the SG on conflict-related sexual violence (2012)
 Report of the SG on conflict-related sexual violence (2013) 
 Report of the SG on conflict-related sexual violence (2014) 
 Report of the SG on conflict-related sexual violence (2015) 
 Report of the SG on conflict-related sexual violence (2016) 
 Report of the SG on conflict-related sexual violence (2017)
 Report of the SG on conflict-related sexual violence (2018)
 Report of the SG on conflict-related sexual violence (2019)
 Report of the SG on conflict-related sexual violence (2020)
 Report of the SG on conflict-related sexual violence (2021)
 Report of the SG on conflict-related sexual violence (2022)
 
The first time the Security Council addressed the impacts of armed conflict on women was in Resolution 1325 (2000). The document focuses on the need for specific protections for women and girls in conflict and expresses the need to consider gender perspectives in mission, UN peace support operations, and post-conflict processes.

Resolution 1820 (2008) of the UN Security Council declares that rape and other forms of sexual violence "can constitute war crimes, crimes against humanity or a constitutive act with respect to genocide".

UN Special Representative on Sexual Violence in Conflict 

 

Resolution 1888 (2009) is perceived as an advancement in international law as it created the Office of the Special Representative of the Secretary General for Sexual Violence in Conflict (SRSG-SVC). The first Special Representative, Margot Wallström, was appointed in April 2010. The second Special Representative Zainab Hawa Bangura served in the position from September 2012 to April 2017, when the third Special Representative Pramila Patten took office. The Office identified eight priority countries: Bosnia and Herzegovina; Central African Republic (CAR); Colombia; Cote d’Ivoire; Democratic Republic of Congo (DRC); Liberia; South Sudan and Sudan. SRSG-SVC is also engaged in the Middle East (Syria) and in Asia and the Pacific (Cambodia).

Key priorities of the Office are:

 to end impunity for sexual violence in conflict by assisting national authorities to strengthen criminal accountability, responsiveness to survivors and judicial capacity;
 the protection and empowerment of civilians who face sexual violence in conflict, in particular, women and girls who are targeted disproportionately by this crime;
 to mobilize political ownership by fostering government engagement in developing and implementing strategies to combat sexual violence;
 to increase recognition of rape as a tactic and consequence of war through awareness-raising activities at the international and country levels;
 to harmonise the UN's response by leading UN Action Against Sexual Violence in Conflict, a network of focal points from 13 UN agencies that amplify programming and advocacy on this issue in the wider UN agenda;
 to emphasize greater national ownership.

Resolution 1960 (2010) reaffirms that sexual violence is systematic, rampant and widespread. The resolution creates new institutional tools for the prevention and protection from sexual violence. The aim of the resolution is to provide further steps for combating impunity and recognizing sexual violence as a serious breach of human rights law and international humanitarian law.

Resolution 2106 (2013) reasserts fundamental requirements for the prevention of sexual violence in conflict and post-conflict setting: gender equality, women empowerment, and the importance of implementing the full range of commitments found in resolution 1325.

See also 
 Comfort women
 Carla del Ponte
 Louise Arbour
 Marital rape laws by country
 Marry-your-rapist law
 Navi Pillay
 Office of the Special Representative of the Secretary-General on Sexual Violence in Conflict
 Rwandan genocide
 Forced conversion of minority girls in Pakistan

 Sexual slavery
 United Nations Special Rapporteur on Violence Against Women
 Wartime sexual violence

References

Further reading

External links 
 ICRC Resource Center. Sexual violence in armed conflicts: questions and answers  
 Office of the Special Representative of the Secretary General for Sexual Violence in Conflict
 UN Action against Sexual Violence in Conflict Brochure
 Stop Rape Now. UN Action Against Sexual Violence in Conflict
 Reporting and interpreting data on sexual violence from conflict-affected countries
 UN Action against sexual violence in conflict: Progress Report 2010-2011
 Addressing Conflict Related Sexual Violence: An analytical inventory of peacekeeping practice
 Global Solution to Sexual Violence in Conflict, Chatham House, 18 February 2013. Speech of the UN SRSG on Sexual Violence in Conflict, Haja Zainab Hawa Bangura. 

Sex crimes
Sexual violence
International law